Rosaireville is a community in the Canadian province of New Brunswick located mainly on Route 440.

History

Notable people

 Lisa LeBlanc

See also
List of communities in New Brunswick

References

Communities in Northumberland County, New Brunswick